Carl Berglund  (1859 – June 30, 1921) was a Swedish politician. He was a member of the Centre Party. He was elected to the Swedish parliament (upper house) in 1919.

Members of the Riksdag from the Centre Party (Sweden)
1859 births
1921 deaths
Members of the Första kammaren